Gambara is a station on Line 1 of the Milan Metro in Milan, Italy. The station is underground and is located at Piazza Veronica Gambara.

History 
The station was opened on 2 April 1966 as the western terminus of the section between Pagano and Gambara. It remained the terminus until 18 April 1975, when the line was extended to Inganni.

References

Line 1 (Milan Metro) stations
Railway stations opened in 1966